The 2013 Algarve Cup was the twentieth edition of the Algarve Cup, an annual invitational women's football tournament hosted by the Portuguese Football Federation (FPF).

Teams
The following teams were taking part. There were no debutantes, as all teams played in previous editions.

Format
The twelve invited teams were divided into three groups, and played in a round-robin tournament format within each group. 

Groups A and B contained the strongest ranked teams, and were the only ones in contention to win the title. The group A and B winners contested the final – to win the Algarve Cup. The runners-up played for third place, and those that finish the group third played for fifth place.

The teams in Group C played for places 7–12. The winner of Group C played the team that finished fourth in Group A or B (whichever has the better record) for seventh place. The Group C runner-up played the team who finishes last in Group A or B (with the worse record) for ninth place. The third and fourth-placed teams in Group C played for the eleventh place.

Points awarded follow the standard soccer formula of three points for a win, one point for a draw, and no points for a loss. If two teams were tied with the same number of points in a group, their head-to-head result determined the final standings.

Broadcasting
Eurosport
Eurosport 2
Fox Soccer (USA)
 Integrated Sports (USA)
RTP2 (Portugal)

Squads

Group stage
All times are local (WET/UTC+0).

Group A

Group B

Group C

Placement play-offs

Eleventh place match

Ninth place match

Seventh place match

Fifth place match

Third place match

Final

Goalscorers
3 goals
 Kosovare Asllani
 Alex Morgan

2 goals

 Fanny Vágó
 Yūki Ōgimi
 Renae Cuéllar
 Ada Hegerberg
 Edite Fernandes
 Sara Thunebro
 Jessica Fishlock

1 goal

 Ren Guixin
 Zeng Ying
 Julie Rydahl Bukh
 Pernille Harder
 Sine Hovesen
 Verena Faißt
 Nadine Keßler
 Dzsenifer Marozsán
 Célia Okoyino da Mbabi
 Henrietta Csiszár
 Anita Pádár
 Sara Björk Gunnarsdóttir
 Rakel Hönnudóttir
 Sandra María Jessen
 Hólmfríður Magnúsdóttir
 Katrín Ómarsdóttir
 Nahomi Kawasumi
 Mina Tanaka
 Dinora Garza
 Nayeli Rangel
 Caroline Graham Hansen
 Kristine Wigdahl Hegland
 Laura Luís
 Lisa Dahlkvist
 Antonia Göransson
 Marie Hammarström
 Susanne Moberg
 Lotta Schelin
 Shannon Boxx
 Rachel Buehler
 Whitney Engen
 Ali Krieger
 Christen Press
 Megan Rapinoe
 Sydney Leroux
 Abby Wambach
 Helen Ward

Final standings

References

External links
Official website
ALGARVE WOMEN'S FOOTBALL CUP 2013 – Japan Football Association

 
2013
2013 in women's association football
2012–13 in Portuguese football
March 2013 sports events in Europe
2013 in Portuguese women's sport